USS LSM(R)-198 was a Landing Ship Medium (Rocket) of the US Navy during World War II.

It was laid down at Charleston Navy Yard, Charleston, South Carolina. The ship was commissioned on 12 December 1944.

Service history
During World War II the ship was assigned to the Asiatic Pacific theater as part of the Fifth fleet.

The Kerama Retto islands were a small chain of islands 15 miles west of the southwest tip of Okinawa. The invasion of the Kerma Retto was an opportunity to break in all twelve of the 188-class LSM(R)s. One of the reasons that Admiral Turner wanted to capture Kerama Retto was his knowledge that the Japanese Sea Raiding Units had suicide boats hidden there. On the morning of 29 March three of these boats attacked  but were promptly destroyed. The northern half of the six-mile-wide invasion beach was assigned to Task Force 53, under the command of Rear Admiral Lawrence F. Reifsnider. Embarked were the 1st and 6th Marine Divisions under Major General Roy S. Geiger.

On 13 April 1945, LSM(R)-192, LSM(R)-193, LSM(R)-196, LSM(R)-197, LSM(R)-198, LSM(R)-199 and LC(FF)-535 were assigned to night harassment and destructive bombardment of Ie Shima. They used irregular rocket fire for destructive harassment together with star shells fired from their 5-inch guns for illumination and harassment. Their 40 mm guns prevented reinforcement of the beach defenses. The night patrols of the surrounding waters prevented any movement or mine laying. On the morning of 16 April, these LSM(R)s were used for rocket attack in support of assault troops. Approximately 2,600 rockets were fired into a large area composed principally of the South Eastern sector of the town of le Shima and the Eastern and South Eastern vicinities of Ie-gushuyama.

Battle of Okinawa
During the long battle of Okinawa, the LSM(R)s were used to form pickets around the Allied Fleet. These pickets were to give advance warning of Japanese air attack, particularly by kamikaze aircraft. The LSM(R)s were used although their flotilla commander noted their unsuitability for the task.

Notes

References 

LSM-LSM(R) WW II Amphibious Forces Vol. II, Turner Publishing Co., 1996.
Stewart, James M. (2003) "90 Day Naval Wonder"
Friedman, Norman (2002) "US Amphibious Ships and Crafts" Naval Institute Press, Annapolis, MD
Francis, Dennis L. C.T.G. 52.21.Commander LSM Flotilla NINE USS LC(FF) 525, Flagship April 1945

World War II amphibious warfare vessels of the United States
1944 ships
LSM(R)-188-class landing ships medium